The 1970 European Cup was the 3rd edition of the European Cup of athletics.

The Finals were held in Stockholm, Sweden (men) and Budapest, Hungary (women).

Final
Held on 29 and 30 August in Stockholm (men) and on 22 August (women) in Budapest.

Team standings

Results summary

Men's events

Women's events

Semifinals

Men
All semifinals were held on 1 and 2 August. First two teams advanced to the final. Sweden advanced as the host of the final.

Semifinal 1
Held in Sarajevo, Yugoslavia

Semifinal 2
Held in Helsinki, Finland

Semifinal 3
Held in Zurich, Switzerland

Women
All semifinals were held on 22 August. First two teams advanced to the final.

Semifinal 1
Held in East Berlin, East Germany

Semifinal 2
Held in Herford, West Germany

Semifinal 3
Held in Bucharest, Romania

Preliminaries

Men
All preliminaries were held on 20–21 June. First two teams advanced to the semifinals.

Preliminary 1
Held in Barcelona

Preliminary 2
Held in Vienna

Preliminary 3
Held in Reykjavík

References

External links
European Cup results (Men) from GBR Athletics
European Cup results (Women) from GBR Athletics

European Cup (athletics)
European Cup
1970 in Swedish sport
International athletics competitions hosted by Sweden
1970 in Hungarian sport
International athletics competitions hosted by Hungary